Elections to Lewisham London Borough Council were held in May 1994.  The whole council was up for election.

Lewisham local elections are held every four years, with the next due in 1998.

Election result

|}

Ward results

References

1994
1994 London Borough council elections